Jan Kubala (born 5 May 2000) is a former Czech footballer who played as a left wing-back.

Club career
Born in Frýdek-Místek, Kubala started playing football at his local club, where he won the Nike Premier Cup in 2015. The following year, he joined Baník Ostrava's youth sector, where he played for one year before signing for Serie A side Udinese in 2017.

Although he primarily featured for the Under-19 squad, Kubala also received several call-ups to the Italian club's first team: however, he never made his senior debut for Udinese.

In 2020, the player was sent on loan to Czech National Football League side Slavoj Vyšehrad.

After playing one more season for Udinese's Under-19s as an over-age player, on 16 June 2022 Kubala officially returned to Baník Ostrava, where he signed a one-year contract with an option for another year.

In November 2022, after he spent the autumn on loan in MFK Vyškov, Kubala decided to end his professional career and go to study.

International career 
Kubala has been a youth international for the Czech Republic, having represented his country at under-17 and under-18 levels.

References

External links
 
 Jan Kubala Player profile at Baník Ostrava's official website.

2000 births
Czech footballers
Living people
Association football midfielders
Udinese Calcio players
FC Slavoj Vyšehrad players
Czech National Football League players
Czech expatriate footballers
Expatriate footballers in Italy
Czech expatriate sportspeople in Italy

FC Baník Ostrava players